Amysoria is a genus of skippers in the butterfly family Hesperiidae.

References
Natural History Museum Lepidoptera genus database

Hesperiidae
Hesperiidae genera